Kolathur, கொளத்தூர் (புதுக்கோட்டை) (சட்டமன்றத் தொகுதி - 190) was former state assembly constituency in Tamil Nadu. Formed in the year 1977, it was a part of Pudukkottai (Lok Sabha constituency) till the Delimitation of Constituencies, 2008. In 2006 assembly election, it had a total of 1,97,012 voters out of which 97,346 were male and 99,666 were female voters. Post delimitation, Kolathur (SC) was dissolved and its territories were shared between the newly formed Gandarvakottai and Viralimalai constituencies.

Members of Legislative Assembly

Election results

2006

2001

1996

1991

1989

1984

1980

1977

References

External links
 

Former assembly constituencies of Tamil Nadu